Drasteria inepta, the inept drasteria, is a moth of the family Erebidae. It is found from Arizona to Texas, north to Colorado and Utah.

The wingspan is 35–43 mm. Adults are on wing from April to August.

References

External links

Drasteria
Moths described in 1881
Moths of North America